Poland has entered the Junior Eurovision Song Contest nine times, competing in the first contest in . In 2016, it was announced that Poland would return after an 11-year break.

TVP stated that the contestant could be chosen through the existing program Mini szansa, and would be broadcast on the secondary channel TVP2. This however did not materialise, and Poland remained out of the contest. On 14 June 2016, the Head of Music at TVP announced that Poland was considering a return to the Junior Eurovision Song Contest in 2016, after an 11-year absence from the contest. He stated that an invitation was issued to potential participants to submit songs to the broadcaster, but reaffirmed that they had not made a complete decision on whether they would actually be participating. On 30 August 2016, TVP officially confirmed that Poland would return and launched its national selection.

History

The Polish broadcaster, Telewizja Polska (TVP), were in charge of organising their entrants into the contest. Thirteen participants took part in the first national selection which was held on 28 September 2003. The winner who went on to represent Poland at the Junior Eurovision Song Contest 2003 was Katarzyna Żurawik with her song "Coś mnie nosi". Żurawik performed in position 7 at the contest. She finished in last place scoring 3 points. In 2004, girl group KWADro represented country with song "Łap życie"; however, Poland again came last scoring 3 points. Despite TVP signing a 3-year contract with the European Broadcasting Union (EBU), they later decided to withdraw from the contest.

However, Poland decided to remain absent from the contest. On 14 June 2016, the Head of Music at TVP announced that Poland was considering a return to the Junior Eurovision Song Contest in 2016, after a 12-year absence from the contest. He stated that an invitation was issued to potential participants to submit songs to the broadcaster, but reaffirmed that they had not made yet a complete decision on whether they would actually be participating. On 30 August 2016, TVP officially confirmed that Poland would return and launched its national selection.
In 2018, the form of choosing a representative and song changed - the person representing Poland was selected internally based on the viewers' votes in the previously performed program The Voice Kids and the song was fully internally. Roksana Węgiel was as the Polish representative, competing with the song "Anyone I Want to Be". She won the contest and gave Poland its first victory in the competition. In 2019 in Gliwice, the host country used a children's talent show format, Szansa na sukces, as the selection method for their artist. Viki Gabor and her song "Superhero" represented Poland and won with 278 points. It is the second time Poland won and the first time a country won on home soil. As hosts, they finished 9th being represented by Ala Tracz and the song "I'll Be Standing", which is their worst result since 2016. In the following year, Poland achieved its third podium result by finishing on 2nd place with Sara James.

Participation overview

Commentators and spokespersons

The contests are broadcast online worldwide through the official Junior Eurovision Song Contest website junioreurovision.tv and YouTube. In 2015, the online broadcasts featured commentary in English by junioreurovision.tv editor Luke Fisher and 2011 Bulgarian Junior Eurovision Song Contest entrant Ivan Ivanov. The Polish broadcaster, TVP, sent their own commentators to the contest in order to provide commentary in the Polish language. Spokespersons were also chosen by the national broadcaster in order to announce the awarding points from Poland. The table below list the details of each commentator and spokesperson since 2003.

Hostings

See also
Poland in the Eurovision Dance Contest – Dance version of the Eurovision Song Contest.
Poland in the Eurovision Song Contest – Senior version of the Junior Eurovision Song Contest.
Poland in the Eurovision Young Dancers – A competition organised by the EBU for younger dancers aged between 16 and 21.
Poland in the Eurovision Young Musicians – A competition organised by the EBU for musicians aged 18 years and younger.

References

 
Countries in the Junior Eurovision Song Contest